"Megan's Piano" is a song by American rapper Megan Thee Stallion, released on October 29, 2021, as track six from her compilation album Something for Thee Hotties. It was written by Megan, alongside frequent producer LilJuMadeDaBeat, with Megan earning her first producer credit for playing and  composing the song's piano riff. The song was noted for Megan's vintage, "hard-hitting" bars and the "stabbing" piano riff. It impacted rhythmic and urban radio on November 30, 2021, as the second single from Something for Thee Hotties.

Background and composition
"Megan's Piano" was one of several songs added to the album just hours before its release. Megan Thee Stallion explained that although she is not a professional piano player, she just played the melodies on a piano because she knew the sound she was going for. As she was playing around with the keys, she asked her producer LilJuMadeDaBeat to make a beat out of it; this can be heard in the song's intro as the two go back and forth in trying to combine the piano with the beat.
The song features "vintage" Meg bars over what was described as an "uncharacteristically minimal" Lil Ju beat, which contains a "stabbing" piano and a "bouncy" bassline, as Megan references a Nike deal she just closed, among other things.

Critical reception
In their album review, Pitchforks Dylan Green said "the run of tracks from 'Megan's Piano' to 'Pipe Up' has the buzzy energy of a marathon studio session". Njera Perkins of PopSugar named it among the songs on the album that shows Megan's "hard-hitting bars are back in full force".

Charts

Certifications

Release history

References

2021 songs
2021 singles
Megan Thee Stallion songs
Songs written by Megan Thee Stallion